Events in the year 1914 in Norway.

Incumbents
Monarch – Haakon VII
Prime Minister – Gunnar Knudsen

Events

 May 5 – November 11 – The Jubilee Exhibition (Jubilæumsutstillingen) is held at Kristiania, Norway, to mark the centennial of the country's Constitution.

Popular culture

Sports

25 June – Aalesunds FK football club was founded.

Music

Film

Literature
Vaaren, novel by Sigrid Undset.
 The Olav Duun novel Tre venner (Three Friends) was published.

Births

4 January – Fredrik Stabel, illustrator and satirical writer (died 2001)
31 January – Hans Martin Gulbrandsen, canoeist (died 1979)
4 February – Tore Holthe, rear admiral (died 1973)
3 March – Håkon Johnsen, politician (died 1991)
7 March – Knut Bergsland, linguist (died 1998)
7 March – Arne Jensen, banker (died 2002)
18 March – Trygve Haugeland, politician and Minister (died 1998)
20 March – Lilly Bølviken, judge (died 2011)
9 April – Ottar Fjærvoll, politician (died 1995)
28 April – Johan Møller Warmedal, politician (died 1988)
29 April – Erling Evensen, cross country skier and Olympic bronze medallist (died 1998)
26 May – Edel Eckblad, actress (died 1994)
2 June – Alfred Thommesen, ship owner and politician (died 1988)
8 June – Kåre Siem, musician and writer (died 1986)
13 June – Olav Aase, politician (died 1992)
16 June – Otto Dahl, politician (died 1978)
17 June – Halvor Thorbjørn Hjertvik, politician (died 1995)
26 June – Arnfinn Severin Roald, politician (died 1983)
30 June – Magnar Hellebust, politician (died 2008)
5 July – Toralf Westermoen, engineer, pioneer for the development of high speed craft (died 1986)
6 July – Inga Lovise Tusvik, politician (died 1992)
23 July – Reidar Kvammen, international soccer player (died 1998)
23 July – Alf Prøysen, writer and musician (died 1970)
9 August – Leif Hamre, military officer and children's writer (died 2007)
18 August – Oddvar Sponberg, race walker (died 1975)
24 August – Rolf Holmberg, soccer player and Olympic bronze medallist (died 1979)
24 August – Ivar Iversen, canoeist (died 2012)
21 September – Else Hagen, visual artist (died 2010).
30 September – Bjarne Flem, politician (died 1999)
6 October – Thor Heyerdahl, ethnographer and adventurer (died 2002)
27 October – Rolv Ryssdal, judge (died 1998)

Full date unknown
Undis Blikken, female speed skating pioneer and World Champion (died 1992)
Sigurd Engelstad, genealogist and archivist (died 2006)
Arnholdt Kongsgaard, ski jumper (died 1991)
Gotfred Kvifte, physicist (died 1997)
Jens Christian Mellbye, judge (died 1993)
Gunnar Randers, physicist (died 1992)
Øistein Strømnæs, intelligence officer (died 1980)
Anne Margrethe Strømsheim, resistance member (died 2008)

Deaths

21 January – Theodor Kittelsen, artist (born 1857)
3 February – Johannes Skar, educator and folklorist (b. 1837).
19 April – Frederik Collett, painter (born 1839)
11 September – Edvard Larsen, triple jumper and Olympic bronze medallist (born 1881)
1 October – Kitty Lange Kielland, painter (born 1843)
30 October – Johan Christopher Brun, pharmacist and politician (born 1838)

Full date unknown
Niels Stockfleth Darre Eckhoff, architect (born 1831)

See also

References

External links

 
Norway
Norway